Cadra delattinella is a species of snout moth in the genus Cadra. It was described by Roesler in 1965, and is known from Turkey, Greece and Crete.

References

Phycitini
Moths described in 1965
Moths of Europe
Moths of Asia